Nosea hainanensis is only species in the butterfly genus Nosea of the family Nymphalidae endemic to  China.

Subspecies
Nosea hainanensis hainanensis
Nosea hainanensis guangxiensis Chou & Li, 1994 (Guangxi)

References

Butterflies described in 1993
Satyrini